Milford is a census-designated place in Lassen County, California. Its population is 147 as of the 2020 census, down from 167 from the 2010 census.

The settlement began when Judson Dakin and J.C. Wemple opened a mill at the site in 1861. The first post office at Milford opened in 1864 and closed for a period during 1879.

On August 22, 2021, the Dixie fire approached Milford but fire crews were able to protect the structures.

Geography
According to the United States Census Bureau, the CDP has a total area of 5.3 square miles (13.7 km), of which over 99% is land.

Demographics
The 2010 United States Census reported that Milford had a population of 167. The racial makeup of Milford was 150 (89.8%) White, 1 (0.6%) African American, 1 (0.6%) Native American, 1 (0.6%) Asian, 1 (0.6%) Pacific Islander, 4 (2.4%) from other races, and 9 (5.4%) from two or more races. Hispanic or Latino of any race were 11 persons (6.6%).

The Census reported that 167 people (100% of the population) lived in households, 0 (0%) lived in non-institutionalized group quarters, and 0 (0%) were institutionalized.

There were 69 households, out of which 22 (31.9%) had children under the age of 18 living in them, 35 (50.7%) were opposite-sex married couples living together, 9 (13.0%) had a female householder with no husband present, 3 (4.3%) had a male householder with no wife present.  There were 6 (8.7%) unmarried opposite-sex partnerships, and 1 (1.4%) same-sex married couples or partnerships. 16 households (23.2%) were made up of individuals, and 5 (7.2%) had someone living alone who was 65 years of age or older. The average household size was 2.42.  There were 47 families (68.1% of all households); the average family size was 2.85.

The population was spread out, with 33 people (19.8%) under the age of 18, 18 people (10.8%) aged 18 to 24, 34 people (20.4%) aged 25 to 44, 61 people (36.5%) aged 45 to 64, and 21 people (12.6%) who were 65 years of age or older.  The median age was 43.8 years. For every 100 females, there were 111.4 males.  For every 100 females age 18 and over, there were 116.1 males.

There were 81 housing units at an average density of 15.3 per square mile (5.9/km), of which 48 (69.6%) were owner-occupied, and 21 (30.4%) were occupied by renters. The homeowner vacancy rate was 4.0%; the rental vacancy rate was 8.7%.  122 people (73.1% of the population) lived in owner-occupied housing units and 45 people (26.9%) lived in rental housing units.

Politics

References

Census-designated places in Lassen County, California
Populated places established in 1861
Census-designated places in California
1861 establishments in California